Hussein Carneil (born 9 May 2003) is a Swedish footballer who plays for IFK Göteborg as an attacking midfielder.

Personal life
Born in Afghanistan, he and his family fled the country when he was 3 years old.

References

External links
 

2003 births
Living people
Afghan emigrants to Sweden
People from Trollhättan Municipality
Swedish footballers
IFK Göteborg players
Allsvenskan players
Association football forwards